Ben Harris may refer to:

Sports
Ben Harris (1910s pitcher) (1889–1927), major league pitcher
Ben Harris (1920s pitcher), American baseball player
Ben Harris (Australian rules footballer) (born 1963), former Australian rules footballer
Ben Harris (cricketer) (born 1964), New Zealand first-class cricketer who played for Canterbury and Otago
Ben Harris (rugby league) (born 1983), Australian rugby league player
Ben Harris (rugby union, born 1989), English rugby union prop
Ben Harris (rugby union, born 1999), English rugby union wing and rugby sevens Olympian

Others
Ben Harris (politician) (born 1976), member of the Missouri House of Representatives
Ben Harris (economist) (born 1977), American economist
Ben Harris, winner of Mr Gay UK in 1998
Ben Harris, member of the band Dirty Vegas

See also
Benjamin Harris (disambiguation)